This is the list of cathedrals in Pakistan sorted by denomination.

Roman Catholic
Cathedrals of the Roman Catholic Church in Pakistan:
 Cathedral of Sts. Peter and Paul in Faisalabad
 St. Francis Xavier Cathedral, Hyderabad in Hyderabad
 St. Joseph's Cathedral in Rawalpindi
 St. Patrick’s Cathedral in Karachi
 Sacred Heart Cathedral in Lahore
 Cathedral of the Resurrection in Multan
 Holy Rosary Church, pro-cathedral in  Quetta

Anglican
Cathedrals of the Church of Pakistan:
 Cathedral Church of the Resurrection, Lahore
 Holy Trinity Cathedral Church in Sialkot
 Saint John’s Cathedral in Peshawar
 St. Mary's Cathedral in Raiwind
 Holy Trinity Cathedral in Karachi

See also

[[List of cathedrals]Multan Cathedral of St Mary the virgin,MultanCantt]
Christianity in Pakistan

References

Cathedrals in Pakistan
Pakistan
Cathedrals
Cathedrals